The 1956 Australian Grand Prix was a motor race for Formula Libre cars held at Albert Park Street Circuit, in Victoria, Australia on 2 December 1956. The race, which had 22 starters, was held over 80 laps of the five kilometre circuit, the longest of all the Australian Grands Prix at 402 kilometres. It attracted a crowd of over 120,000 spectators.

The race was the twenty first Australian Grand Prix and the second to be held on a street circuit situated around the Albert Park Lake, the current location of the race. It had been moved to the end of the year, and the rotational system which shifted the race from state to state was suspended to allow the AGP to capitalise on the publicity generated around the 1956 Olympic Games which were being held in Melbourne. With the presence of the works Officine Alfieri Maserati racing team, bringing with them Stirling Moss, Jean Behra and a fleet of 250F, and fellow European based racers Ken Wharton, Peter Whitehead and Reg Parnell, the race became the most important motor racing event held in Australia's history to that point.

Moss and Behra dominated the two-week festival which began the previous weekend with the Australian Tourist Trophy sports car race in which the duo placed first and second, each driving a Maserati 300S. In the Grand Prix the two were again dominant, but Moss was a class above Behra coming close to lapping his teammate. The two Scuderia Ambrosiana entered Ferraris of Peter Whitehead and Reg Parnell were not a serious threat but Whitehead did have the measure of the local drivers with the 1938 Australian Grand Prix winner finishing two laps clear of the first of the Australians, Maserati 250F driver Reg Hunt. Parnell finished sixth, behind another domestic Maserati 250F driven by Stan Jones. Both finished on the same lap as Hunt, while Lex Davison's older sports car engined Ferrari 625 was another two laps distant. Doug Whiteford's Talbot-Lago was the first non-Italian car home in eighth place. With defending champion Jack Brabham absent the best of the Cooper sourced machinery was Len Lukey's much modified Cooper-Bristol in ninth. Wharton's European-based Maserati 250F failed to reach the finishing line.

Moss's fastest lap of 1:52.2 (100.25 mph) was a new lap record for the Albert Park Circuit.

Classification

References

Grand Prix
Australian Grand Prix
Motorsport at Albert Park
Australian Grand Prix